Frederick Moore (17 January 1931 – 17 March 2016) was an English cricketer from Rochdale. He played 24 first-class matches for Lancashire between 1954 and 1958. Moore also played for Lowerhouse Cricket Club in the Lancashire League in the 1959 season.

References

External links
Frederick Moore profile at CricketArchive

1931 births
2016 deaths
Cricketers from Rochdale
English cricketers
Lancashire cricketers